Freshmen is the second album released by New Zealand hip-hop group, Nesian Mystik, in 2006. The album entered the New Zealand charts at number 8, and was certified gold by the end of the first week with 7,500 sales.

Track listing
"The Arrival"
"What's Next"
"Common Sense"
"Don't Worry"
"One Time"
"Rhythm"
"If It's Cool" (Features J.B from Tyna and J.B)
"Gone Did it"
"People"
"Robbin' Hood Heroes"
"Sail Away"
"Make Me Sweat"
"This Ain't A Love Song" (Features Shiban)
"9.2.5"
"So Good"
"Yours Sincerely"

References

Nesian Mystik albums
2006 albums